Gabby Thomas may refer to:

 Gabrielle Thomas, American track and field athlete
 Gabby Thomas (Emmerdale), a character on the British soap opera Emmerdale